Three regiments of the British Army have been numbered the 107th Regiment of Foot:

107th Regiment of Foot (Queen's Own Royal Regiment of British Volunteers), raised in 1761
107th Regiment of Foot, raised in 1794
107th (Bengal Infantry) Regiment of Foot, raised by the East India Company and placed on the British establishment as the 107th Foot in 1862